Johannes "Macky" Steinhoff (15 September 1913 – 21 February 1994) was a Luftwaffe fighter ace during World War II, German general, and NATO official. He was one of very few Luftwaffe pilots who survived to fly operationally through the whole of the war period 1939–45. Steinhoff was also one of the highest-scoring pilots with 176 victories, and one of the first to fly the Messerschmitt Me 262 jet fighter in combat as a member of the Jagdverband 44  squadron led by Adolf Galland. Steinhoff was decorated with the Knight's Cross of the Iron Cross with Oak Leaves and Swords, and later received the Grand Cross of the Order of Merit of the Federal Republic of Germany and several foreign awards including the American Legion of Merit and the French Legion of Honour. He played a role in the so-called Fighter Pilots' Revolt late in the war, when several senior air force officers confronted Hermann Göring.

Steinhoff joined the West German government's Rearmament Office as a consultant on military aviation in 1952 and became one of the principal officials tasked with rebuilding the German Air Force through the Cold War. In retirement, Steinhoff became a widely read author of books on German military aviation during the Second World War and the experiences of the German people at that time.

Early years
Johannes Steinhoff was born on 15 September 1913 in Bottendorf, Thuringia, the son of an agricultural mill-worker and his traditional housewife. He had two brothers, Bernd and Wolf, and two sisters, Greta and Charlotte. His sister Charlotte married Ludwig Hahn, the chief of the Sicherheitspolizei (Security Police) and Sicherheitsdienst (Security Service) in occupied Warsaw, who participated in the evacuation and destruction of the Warsaw Ghetto.

Steinhoff graduated from the Klosterschule Roßleben convent school after having "studied the classics and languages such as French, English, Latin and Greek," and from 1932–1934 he read philology at the University of Jena, where he was a member of the Landsmannschaft Suevia academic fencing society and male fraternity. Forced to abandon his university studies for lack of funds, Steinhoff enlisted in the Kriegsmarine, where he served for one year alongside his friend Dietrich Hrabak as a naval flying cadet before transferring to the newly reformed Luftwaffe in 1936.

Steinhoff was promoted to Leutnant (second lieutenant) on 1 April 1936. He married his wife Ursula on 29 April 1939 and they had a son, Wolf and a daughter, Ursula. Ursula married economics professor and (now-retired) Colorado State Senator Michael Bird. On 1 January 1939, Steinhoff was promoted to Oberleutnant (first lieutenant).

In the early summer of 1939, the Luftwaffe began experimenting with night fighter procedures for single engine aircraft. Due to a lack of experienced flyers, operations were restricted to evening and early morning hours. On 1 August, Steinhoff was appointed Staffelkapitän (squadron leader) of 11. (Nachtjagd) Staffel (squadron) of Lehrgeschwader 2 (JG 2—2nd Demonstration Wing) which was based at Greifswald. Initially, the squadron was equipped with the Arado Ar 68 fighter before it was reequipped with the Messerschmitt Bf 109 D-1. The unit was subordinated to the Stab (headquarters unit) of Kampfgeschwader 2 (JG 2—2nd Bomber Wing).

World War II
World War II in Europe began on Friday 1 September 1939, when German forces invaded Poland. That day, Steinhoff was transferred to Jagdgeschwader 26 "Schlageter" (JG 26—26th Fighter Wing), which had been named after Albert Leo Schlageter on 1 May 1939. He was appointed Staffelkapitän of a newly created night fighter unit named 10. (Nacht) Staffel of JG 26 which was based at Bonn-Hangelar, near Sankt Augustin, and equipped with the Bf 109 D. On 12 November, the unit was moved to Jever Airfield. On 18 December, Royal Air Force (RAF) Bomber Command launched an attack on German warships assumed to be at Wilhelmshaven in what became known as the Battle of the Heligoland Bight.

On 3 February 1940, a new night fighter unit was created by consolidating three independent single engine fighter squadrons at Jever Airfield. This unit was labelled IV. (Nacht) Gruppe (4th night group) of Jagdgeschwader 2 "Richthofen" (JG 2—2nd Fighter Wing) and placed under the leadership of Hauptmann Albert Blumensaat. In consequence, 10. (Nacht) Staffel of JG 26 became the 11. (Nacht) Staffel of JG 2 which was headed by Steinhoff and was based at Hage. On 23 April, 11. (Nacht) and 12. (Nacht) Staffeln of JG 2 were ordered to Aalborg Airfield in support of Operation Weserübung, the German assault on Denmark and Norway. The two squadrons returned to Germany on 9 May in preparation for the Battle of France. At the start of the campaign on 10 May, 11. (Nacht) Staffel was based at Cologne Butzweilerhof Airfield where it supported Army Group B in the Battle of the Netherlands. That day, Steinhof claimed a Bristol Blenheim bomber near The Hague and a second near Düsseldorf.

In August 1940, he was transferred to 4. Staffel of Jagdgeschwader 52 (JG 52—52nd Fighter Wing) where he replaced Oberleutnant Heinz Schumann as Staffelkapitän. The Staffel was subordinated to II. Gruppe of JG 52 which was headed by Hauptmann Wilhelm Ensslen. At the time, the Gruppe was based at Peuplingues near the English Channel and were fighting the RAF during the Battle of Britain. Steinhoff claimed his fifth aerial victory on 30 September. He was credited with the destruction of a Supermarine Spitfire fighter over Dorking. II. Gruppe was withdrawn from the Channel Front on 2 November and moved to München Gladbach, present-day Mönchengladbach, on 5 November for a period of rest and replenishment.  The Gruppe had also lost its commanding officer, Ensslen, who was killed in action on 2 November. Ensslen was replaced by Hauptmann Erich Woitke. On 22 December, II. Gruppe was ordered to Leeuwarden Airfield where they were tasked with flying fighter patrols along the Dutch North Sea coast. On 15 January 1941, the Gruppe moved to Ypenburg Airfield where they stayed until 10 February. The Gruppe then moved to Berck-sur-Mer on 14 February, where Steinhoff claimed to have shot down another Spitfire in aerial combat, near Dungeness. On 17 May, II. Gruppe reached Raversijde, its last airfield near the English Channel. Two days later, Steinhoff claimed to have shot down a further two Spitfires on a mission to Canterbury. On 9 June, the air elements of II. Gruppe began relocating east.

Operation Barbarossa

In preparation of Operation Barbarossa, the German invasion of the Soviet Union, II. Gruppe of JG 52, without a period of replenishment in Germany, was ordered to airfields close to the German-Soviet demarcation line. While the Gruppenstab (group headquarters unit) and 4. Staffel were based at Suwałki in northeastern Poland, 5. and 6. Staffel were transferred to a forward airfield at Sobolewo. For the invasion, II. Gruppe of JG 52 was subordinated to the Geschwaderstab (headquarters unit) of Jagdgeschwader 27 (JG 27—27th Fighter Wing). The Geschwader was part of the VIII. Fliegerkorps commanded by Generaloberst Wolfram Freiherr von Richthofen which supported the northern wing of Army Group Centre.

On 22 June, the German forces launched the attack on the Soviet Union which opened the Eastern Front. The Gruppe supported the advancing 9th Army and 3rd Panzer Group in their attack on the border fortifications east and southeast of Suwałki. That day, Steinhoff claimed a Soviet Polikarpov I-153 fighter shot down near Varėna in Lithuania. On 25 June, the Gruppe moved to an airfield at Varėna which had previously been occupied by the Soviet Air Forces (VVS—Voyenno-Vozdushnye Sily). The next day, Steinhoff claimed an Ilyushin DB-3 bomber shot down south of Varėna. On 28 June, the Gruppe moved to Maladzyechna, supporting the advance 3rd Panzer Group near Barysaw.

On 24 August, II. Gruppe was ordered to an airfield at Spasskaya Polist on the river Polist, south of Chudovo and north of Novgorod on Lake Ilmen, supporting the 18th Army in its advance towards the Neva and Lake Ladoga. Here, Steinhoff claimed his 35th aerial victory on 29 Augus, for which he was awarded the Knight's Cross of the Iron Cross the following day.

Eastern Front
On 24 January 1942, having been withdrawn from the Eastern Front, II. Gruppe arrived in Jesau near Königsberg, present-day Kaliningrad in Russia, for a period of recuperation and replenishment. That day, the commander of the Gruppe, Woitke, was transferred. On 1 March, Steinhoff became its new Gruppenkommandeur (group commander). In consequence, command of 4. Staffel was handed to Oberleutnant Gerhard Barkhorn. In Jesau, the Gruppe received many factory new Bf 109 F-4 aircraft. On 14 April, II. Gruppe received orders to move to Pilsen, present-day Plzeň in the Czech Republic, for relocation to the Eastern Front.

II. Here, Steinhoff claimed his 100th aerial victory on 31 August when he shot down two LaGG-3 fighters. He was the 18th Luftwaffe pilot to achieve the century mark. On 1 September, II. Gruppe was ordered to and airfield at Kerch on the Kerch Peninsula. The objective was to capture the Taman Peninsula and Novorossiysk. Here, Steinhoff was credited with the destruction of a minesweeper and the sinking of a motorboat.

On 2 September, Steinhoff was awarded the Knight's Cross of the Iron Cross with Oak Leaves. He was the 115th member of the German armed forces to be so honoured. On 4 November, Steinhoff, together with Alfred Druschel, Ernst-Wilhelm Reinert, Günther Rall and Max Stotz received the Oak Leaves from Adolf Hitler personally. On 11 December, during the Battle of Stalingrad, Steinhoff was hit by anti-aircraft artillery in his Bf 109 G-2 (Werknummer 13853—factory number), resulting in a forced landing near Oblivskaya.

Wing commander
Steinhoff left JG 52 on 24 March 1943 and handed over II. Gruppe to Hauptmann Helmut Kühle. On 1 April, he was given command of Jagdgeschwader 77 (JG 77—77th Fighter Wing) as Geschwaderkommodore (wing commander) after its former commander, Major Joachim Müncheberg, had been killed in action on 23 March. Steinhoff took command JG 77 on 3 April. At the time, the Geschwader was based at an airfield north of Sfax, Tunisia and was fighting in the North African campaign. The following day, Steinhoff claimed his only aerial victory in North Africa when he shot down a Spitfire fighter on a mission to El Guettar. On 5 April, he was shot down by a Spitfire fighter resulting in a forced landing at La Fauconnerie which destroyed his Bf 109 G-6 (Werknummer 16492).

Before noon on 25 June, Luftwaffe radar on Monte Erice picked up a large formation of United States Army Air Forces (USAAF) four-engine bombers north of Sicily. The Luftwaffe initially assumed that the bombers were heading for Naples. In reality, the 124 Boeing B-17 Flying Fortress bombers attacked Messina, causing significant damage. The Luftwaffe aerial defences were coordinated by Generalmajor Adolf Galland, the General der Jagdflieger (General of the Fighter Force), and his Inspekteur der Jadgflieger Süd (Inspector of Fighter Pilots South), Oberst Günther Lützow, personally. Galland had intended to consolidate fighters from both JG 77 and Jagdgeschwader 53 (JG 53—53rd Fighter Wing) and to vector the fighters in a closed formation to a point of interception. Because the target was mistaken, the bombers could only be intercepted on their return. Galland scrambled approximately 80 fighters from Stab, I., II. Gruppe of JG 77 and Gruppe of JG 53 at 12:55. Due to hazy weather conditions, the German formation was spread out, and failed to find the bombers quickly. Only a few Luftwaffe fighters reached the bombers, including Steinhoff who shot down a B-17.

Steinhoff was promoted to Oberstleutnant (lieutenant colonel) on 1 April 1944. On 28 July 1944, Steinhoff received the Knight's Cross of the Iron Cross with Oak Leaves and Swords.

On 7 November, Steinhoff left JG 77 and was replaced by Major Johannes Wiese. In total, Steinhoff had flown 100 combat missions and had claimed eleven aerial victories while serving with JG 77. On 11 November, Reichsmarschall Hermann Göring, in his role as commander-in-chief of the Luftwaffe, organised a meeting of high-ranking Luftwaffe officers, including General der Jagdflieger Galland and Steinhoff. The meeting, also referred to as the "Areopag", was held at the Luftkriegsakademie (air war academy) at Berlin-Gatow. This Luftwaffe version of the Greek Areopagus—a court of justice—aimed at finding solutions to the deteriorating air war situation over Germany. At this meeting, Galland asked Steinhoff if he would be interested in commanding the first jet fighter unit.

Flying the Messerschmitt Me 262
Jagdgeschwader 7 "Nowotny" (JG 7—7th Fighter Wing) "Nowotny" was the first operational jet fighter wing in the world and was named after Walter Nowotny, who was killed in action on 8 November 1944. Nowotny had been assessing the Messerschmitt Me 262 jet aircraft under operational conditions. JG 7 was equipped with the Me 262, an aircraft which was heavily armed and faster than any Allied fighter. Galland hoped that the Me 262 would compensate for the Allies' numerical superiority. On 12 November 1944, the Oberkommando der Luftwaffe (OKL—Air Force High Command) ordered JG 7 to be equipped with the Me 262. Following the exchange with Steinhoff at the "Areopag", Galland appointed Steinhoff as its first Geschwaderkommodore.

Steinhoff was allowed to hand-pick several Staffelkapitäne, including Heinz Bär and Gerhard Barkhorn. After the heavy losses suffered during Operation Bodenplatte (Unternehmen Bodenplatte), Steinhoff and other fighter leaders fell into disfavour following the so-called 'Fighter Pilots' Revolt' against what was perceived as the incompetence of Luftwaffe high command and Göring in particular. Along with several others, Steinhoff was relieved of his command for challenging Göring's leadership. He was replaced by Major Theodor Weissenberger.

After a brief period spent in internal exile, Steinhoff transferred to the Jet Experten unit Jagdverband 44 (JV 44—44th Fighter Detachment) being formed by his close friend and confidant Adolf Galland in early 1945. Steinhoff initially acted as a de facto recruiting officer, persuading a number of veteran Luftwaffe aces to join the unit, some coming out of the Fighter Pilots' Rest Home at Bad Wiessee to do so. Steinhoff scored six confirmed kills with the unit. Steinhoff survived nearly 1,000 combat missions, only to see his flying career come to an end on the ground.

As a member of JV 44, Steinhoff was permanently disfigured after receiving major burns across most of his body after crashing his Me 262 after a failed take-off. On 18 April 1945, Steinhoff's Me 262 crashed on take-off from München-Riem airfield. His flight leader's left wheel blew out and caused him to make a sharp left turn, careening into Steinhoff and causing him to run off the runway and rupturing the fuel tanks located in front, under, and behind him. Steinhoff and the men he was going up with that day were armed with an experimental under-wing rocket which, along with the cannon ammunition Steinhoff was carrying, made escape more difficult due to the amount of ordnance exploding around him. According to ace fighter pilot and member of JV 44, Franz Stigler, "In a matter of seconds, Steinhoff had turned into a human torch". His chances of survival were slim although he pulled through, but with severe burns leaving him terribly scarred. Steinhoff spent two years in hospital, and years of reconstructive surgery, with his eyelids being rebuilt by a British surgeon after the war.

His wartime record was 176 aircraft claimed destroyed, of which 152 were on the Eastern Front, 12 on the Western Front and 12 in the Mediterranean. He also flew 993 operational sorties. Steinhoff was shot down 12 times but bailed out only once. Explaining his preference to remain with his damaged aircraft, Steinhoff admitted, "I bailed out only once. I never trusted the parachutes. I always landed my damaged planes, hoping not to get bounced on the way down when I lost power".

Later life and service

With the German Air Force and NATO

Steinhoff was invited by West Germany's new interim government to rebuild the Luftwaffe within NATO, eventually rising to the rank of full general. Steinhoff became the German Military Representative to the NATO Military Committee in 1960, served as Acting Commander Allied Air Forces Central Europe in NATO 1965–1966, as Inspector of the Air Force 1966–1970 and as Chairman of the NATO Military Committee 1971–1974.

Steinhoff received numerous honours for his work on the structure of the post war German Air Force and the integration of the German Federal Armed Forces into NATO, including: The Order of Merit with Star, the American Legion of Merit and the French Légion d'honneur.

 One of Steinhoff's contributions was dealing with the high accident rate the air force was having with its F-104 Starfighters. Upon researching the issue, Steinhoff, who had always been a good teacher, deduced that the problem was not the aircraft but poor training for pilots on that particular aircraft. He addressed the problem with an intensive training regime and the accident rate dropped dramatically.

After retiring from his NATO command in 1974, Steinhoff became a widely read author of books on German military aviation during the war and the experiences of the German people at that time. He wrote The Final Hours, which detailed a late-war plot against Hermann Göring, and also published a vivid account of his time in Italy: Messerschmitts over Sicily: Diary of a Luftwaffe Fighter Commander. Steinhoff also became a water-colourist, and chairman of Germany's Dornier Aviation.

Bitburg cemetery controversy

In May 1985, Steinhoff met Ronald Reagan, then President of the United States, during a visit to the WWII Kolmeshöhe Military Cemetery near Bitburg. The event was planned to be an act of reconciliation on the 40th anniversary of V-E Day. Reagan and West German Chancellor Helmut Kohl were to pay their respects at the German military cemetery. However, the US President faced national and political pressure to cancel the visit from American Jewish groups and World War II American veterans after it was discovered that 22 Waffen-SS men were buried among the 2,000 military graves. The presence of Nazi soldiers led to the controversy because the entire SS had been adjudged to be a criminal organisation at the Nuremberg trials. Although not part of the original itinerary, as part of their own reconciliatory gesture, Reagan and Kohl made an impromptu visit to the Bergen-Belsen concentration camp before visiting Bitburg, thus reducing the time Reagan had to spend at Kolmeshöhe Military Cemetery to only eight minutes. He was joined by Steinhoff, Kohl and 90-year-old US Army General Matthew Ridgway who had commanded the 82nd Airborne in World War II. After Reagan placed a wreath at the cemetery memorial, they all stood to attention while a short trumpet salute was played. At the end, Steinhoff suddenly turned and, in an unscripted act, shook hands with Ridgway. A surprised Kohl later thanked Steinhoff for his actions, who later said that it just seemed to be the right thing to do.

Death

On 21 February 1994, Steinhoff died in a Bonn hospital from complications arising from a heart attack he suffered the previous December. He was 80, and had lived in nearby Bad Godesberg.

Summary of career

Aerial victory claims
According to US historian David T. Zabecki, Steinhoff was credited with 176 aerial victories. Mathews and Foreman, authors of Luftwaffe Aces — Biographies and Victory Claims, researched the German Federal Archives and found records for 168 aerial victory claims, plus nine further unconfirmed claims. This figure of confirmed claims includes 149 aerial victories on the Eastern Front and 19 on the Western Front, including three four-engine bombers and six victories with the Me 262 jet fighter.

Victory claims were logged to a map-reference (PQ = Planquadrat), for example "PQ 95371". These sectors were then subdivided into 36 smaller units to give a location area 3 × 4 km in size.

Awards and honours
Honour Goblet of the Luftwaffe (Ehrenpokal der Luftwaffe) (18 August 1941)
Knight's Cross of the Iron Cross with Oak Leaves and Swords
Knight's Cross on 30 August 1941 as Oberleutnant and Staffelkapitän of the 4./Jagdgeschwader 52
115th Oak Leaves on 2 September 1942 as Hauptmann and Gruppenkommandeur of the II./Jagdgeschwader 52
82nd Swords on 28 July 1944 as Oberstleutnant and Geschwaderkommodore of Jagdgeschwader 77
German Federal Cross of Merit with Star (4 July 1972)
Legion of Merit (1970)
Légion d'honneur (March 1972)

In 1990, the former Royal Air Force Gatow in Berlin Gatow, was named General Steinhoff Kaserne on being taken over by the German Federal Armed Forces. And on September 18, 1997, the Jagdgeschwader 73 (fighter wing 73) of the German Air Force was named "Steinhoff" in honour of the general. Steinhoff is one of only a handful of pilots honoured in this way, along with Manfred von Richthofen and Max Immelmann.

Publications
Steinhoff wrote the following books:

  English translation: Messerschmitts Over Sicily: Diary of a Luftwaffe Fighter Commander 2004. ISBN 978-0-81174-150-7.

Notes

References

Citations

Bibliography

External links
 

1913 births
1994 deaths
People from Roßleben
People from the Province of Saxony
German World War II flying aces
Luftwaffe pilots
Grand Crosses with Star and Sash of the Order of Merit of the Federal Republic of Germany
German Air Force pilots
Generals of the German Air Force
Foreign recipients of the Legion of Merit
Recipients of the Legion of Honour
Recipients of the Knight's Cross of the Iron Cross with Oak Leaves and Swords
Reichsmarine personnel
Military personnel from Thuringia